The Audience with Betty Carter is a 1980 live double album by the American jazz singer Betty Carter.

The album's first track, "Sounds (Movin' On)", is 25 minutes in length and features an epic scat solo. "The Trolley Song" is a nod to the city of San Francisco, where the album was recorded. The second half of the album features several songs written by Carter. The penultimate track is a fresh take on Rodgers and Hammerstein's "My Favorite Things from The Sound of Music, far different from the version by John Coltrane on his 1960 album of the same name. The set ends with the plaintive "Open the Door," Carter's signature tune.

The Audience With Betty Carter was first released on Carter's own Bet-Car Records and later reissued on Verve.

Reception
The Penguin Guide to Jazz awarded the album four out of four stars, including a special crown for a "recording of merit." The review states that "she works the room with consummate skill," and noting that "Billie Holiday doesn't have a crowned album." Billboard magazine gave the album a lukewarm review on its release in 1980, saying that "She won't please all jazz fans - some of her affectations are annoying. But overall, it's a strong package." The Audience with Betty Carter was later included in an appendix to 1000 Recordings to Hear Before You Die.

Track listing
Disc One
"Sounds" (Movin' On) (Betty Carter) – 25:20
"I Think I Got It Now" (Carter) – 3:33
"Caribbean Sun" (Carlos Garnett) – 4:17
"The Trolley Song" (Ralph Blane, Hugh Martin) – 3:37
"Everything I Have Is Yours" (Harold Adamson, Burton Lane) – 6:16
"I'll Buy You a Star" (Dorothy Fields, Arthur Schwartz) – 2:12

Disc Two
"I Could Write a Book" (Lorenz Hart, Richard Rodgers) – 3:41
"Can't We Talk It Over"/"Either It's Love or It Isn't" (Doris Fisher, Allan Roberts)/(Ned Washington, Victor Young) – 7:26
"Deep Night" (Charles Henderson, Rudy Vallée) – 2:45
"Spring Can Really Hang You up the Most" (Fran Landesman, Tommy Wolf) – 7:22
"Tight" (Carter) – 3:44
"Fake" (Carter) – 4:16
"So..." (Carter) – 7:03
"My Favorite Things" (Oscar Hammerstein II, Rodgers) – 4:39
"Open the Door" (Carter) – 5:09

Personnel 
(Recorded December 6–8, 1979, Great American Music Hall, San Francisco)

 Betty Carter - vocals
 John Hicks - piano
 Curtis Lundy - double bass
 Kenny Washington - drums

References

1979 live albums
Betty Carter live albums
Verve Records live albums
Albums recorded at the Great American Music Hall
United States National Recording Registry recordings
United States National Recording Registry albums